BVB International Academy Waterloo is a Canadian semi-professional soccer club based in Waterloo, Ontario that plays in the League1 Ontario men's and women's divisions. Their home stadium is Warrior Field at the University of Waterloo.

Waterloo United partnered with Borussia Dortmund in 2022, becoming part of their BVB International Academy America program, rebranding the League1 Ontario club under this name.

History

The club was founded in 1971 as the Waterloo Minor Soccer Club. In 2011, the club rebranded as Waterloo United. In 2019, the club was awarded the Canada Soccer National Youth Club Licence by the Canadian Soccer Association.

In 2020, the team was to begin play with a U21 team in the League1 Ontario Reserve Division, however, the season was cancelled due to the COVID-19 pandemic. In 2021, lining up with the club's 50th anniversary, they added a team in the League1 Ontario main division. The club also added a team in the League1 Ontario women's division for the 2021 season. The city of Guelph also added men's and women's teams in 2021, setting up a natural local rivalry for the two clubs.  However, due to the COVID-19 pandemic, Waterloo  deferred their entrance to the League1 Ontario top division until 2022.

In 2022, the club struck an affiliation agreement with German club Borussia Dortmund. As part of the agreement, the League1 Ontario teams will compete under the name BVB IA Waterloo.

Seasons

Men

Women

External links
BVB International Academy Waterloo website
BVB International Academy America website
Waterloo United website

References

Soccer clubs in Ontario
League1 Ontario teams
Sport in Waterloo, Ontario
Association football clubs established in 1971
1971 establishments in Ontario